Phlegra tenella is a jumping spider species in the genus Phlegra that lives in Namibia. The male was first described by Wanda Wesołowska in 2006, but the female has yet to be identified.

References

Endemic fauna of Namibia
Salticidae
Fauna of Namibia
Spiders of Africa
Spiders described in 2006
Taxa named by Wanda Wesołowska